Mark Holden (born 1954) is an Australian singer.

Mark Holden may also refer to:

Mark Holden (ice hockey) (born 1957), American ice hockey goaltender
Mark Holden (actor) (born 1962), Canadian actor
Mark Holden (darts player) (born 1960), English darts player
Mark Holden (album), an album by the singer